Sittlichkeit is the concept of "ethical life" or "ethical order" furthered by German philosopher Georg Wilhelm Friedrich Hegel. It was first presented in his work Phenomenology of Spirit (1807) to refer to "ethical behavior grounded in custom and tradition and developed through habit and imitation in accordance with the objective laws of the community" and it was further developed in his work Elements of the Philosophy of Right (1820).

The three spheres of right
In Elements of the Philosophy of Right, Hegel introduces the sphere of abstract right (Recht), as the first of the three spheres of right. It is marked by the concept of personality and the actions of the individuals. This sphere constitutes what Isaiah Berlin would call negative freedom, which is to say, freedom ascertained through the denial of outside impetus. This is the freedom traditionally represented by classical liberalism.

The second sphere constitutes Kantian morality, and is therefore called the sphere of morality (Moralität). This sphere constitutes what Isaiah Berlin would call positive freedom, which is to say, moral autonomy. However, Hegel criticizes the deployment of Kantian morality in society for being insufficient. He explains this deficiency through philosophical critique of pathologies such as loneliness, depression and agony.

The third sphere, the sphere of ethical life (Sittlichkeit), is marked by family life, civil society, and the authoritarian State. This right is traditionally associated with conservatism.

To properly understand the movement from the two first spheres to the last, one must understand that Sittlichkeit'''s normativity transcends the individual—while Moralität'' may be rational and reflective, it is also individualistic. The third sphere is an attempt at describing a limited conception of the person through an appeal to the greater institutional context of the community and an attempt at bridging individual subjective feelings and the concept of general rights.

Influence
Later German thinkers developed the idea in various directions such as the liberal Carl Theodor Welcker, the conservative Friedrich Julius Stahl, and the socialist Wilhelm Weitling.  Welcker connected the idea to constitutional liberties. Stahl related it to a hierarchical godly order. However, Weitling rejected it as oppressive and believed that socialists must work to destroy it. Conservative philosopher Roger Scruton called it a highly original and metaphysically fascinating version of the conservative answer to liberalism.

Notes

References
 David Edward Rose, Hegel's Philosophy of Right, London: Bloomsbury, 2007, ch. 7.
 Allen W. Wood, Hegel's Ethical Thought, Cambridge: Cambridge University Press, 1990, ch. 7.
 Allen W. Wood (ed.), Hegel: Elements of the Philosophy of Right, Cambridge University Press, 1991, xii–xiii.

External links
 The Stanford Encyclopedia of Philosophy on Sittlichkeit
 Hegel: Social and Political Thought: The Philosophy of Right – Internet Encyclopedia of Philosophy

Concepts in ethics
Georg Wilhelm Friedrich Hegel